Patricia Biow Broderick (February 23, 1925 – November 18, 2003) was an American playwright and painter. She was the wife of actor James Broderick and the mother of actor Matthew Broderick.

Early life and career
Broderick was born Patricia Biow in New York City, the daughter of Sophie (née Taub) (1895–1943) and Milton H. Biow (1892–1976), president of an advertising firm. Her family were Jewish immigrants from Germany and Poland. When she was 18, her mother died in 1943 at the age of 48. Her father died 33 years later. In Mexico, Broderick studied painting with Rufino Tamayo who had been her art teacher at the Dalton School in Manhattan. She began writing plays in the 1940s and several of them were performed in New York and London. Her 1996 screenplay for Infinity was based on the life of Nobel Prize-winning physicist Richard Feynman.

Her paintings were displayed in several galleries in New York and across the country. Broderick's partner of her last six years was the painter John Wesley.

Personal life
She married her first husband Jay Kaner in 1945, they divorced in 1947 after two years of marriage. She married her second husband, actor James Broderick in 1949. Together they had three children, including actor Matthew Broderick.

Death
Broderick died of cancer on November 18, 2003, at her home in Greenwich Village, aged 78.

References

External links

Paintings by Patricia Broderick at artnet

1925 births
2003 deaths
20th-century American painters
21st-century American painters
20th-century American dramatists and playwrights
20th-century American women artists
21st-century American women artists
20th-century American screenwriters
20th-century American Jews
21st-century American Jews
American people of German-Jewish descent
American people of Polish-Jewish descent
American women painters
Painters from New York City
Deaths from cancer in New York (state)
Dalton School alumni
Jewish American artists
Jewish painters
Writers from New York City
Screenwriters from New York (state)
Biow family